Yuda (Bashkir and ) is a rural locality (a village) in Badryashevsky Selsoviet, Tatyshlinsky District, Bashkortostan, Russia. The population was 186 as of 2010. There are 2 streets.

Geography 
Yuda is located 9 km north of Verkhniye Tatyshly (the district's administrative centre) by road. Badryashevo is the nearest rural locality.

References 

Rural localities in Tatyshlinsky District